Alonso Gutiérrez, also known as Alonso de la Vera Cruz (c.1507–1584) was a Spanish philosopher and Augustinian, who took the religious name da Vera Cruz. He became a major intellectual figure in New Spain, where he worked from 1535 to 1562, and from 1573 to his death, and in the history of Mexico. 

Gutiérrez was born in Caspueñas, Guadalajara.  He studied under Francisco de Vitoria, at Salamanca University.

He wrote in favour of the human rights of the conquered peoples. In 1553 he became the first professor of the University of Mexico.  He died in Mexico City.

References
John F. Blethen, The Educational Activities of Fray Alonso de La Vera Cruz in Sixteenth Century Mexico, The Americas, Vol. 5, No. 1 (Jul., 1948), pp. 31–47
Arthur Ennis (1957), Fray Alonso de la Vera Cruz, O.S.A. (1507-1584). A Study of His Life and His Contribution to the Religious and Intellectual Affairs of Early Mexico
Ernest J. Burrus, Writings of Alonso de la Vera Cruz (five volumes)

Notes

External links

Biography
 Biography

1500s births
1584 deaths
Augustinian friars
Spanish philosophers
School of Salamanca
16th-century Spanish philosophers